Brian Illman (23 October 1937 – 4 August 2018) was an Australian cricketer. He played in six first-class matches for South Australia in 1960/61.

See also
 List of South Australian representative cricketers

References

External links
 

1937 births
2018 deaths
Australian cricketers
South Australia cricketers
Cricketers from Adelaide